State v. Pike, 49 N.h. 399 (1869), is a criminal case which articulated a product test for an insanity defense. The court in Durham v. United States used it as the basis for what came to be known as the Durham rule.

References

United States criminal case law
Insanity-related case law
Law articles needing an infobox